"P.S My Sunshine" (stylized as "P.S♡MY SUNSHINE") a song by Japanese singer-songwriter Mai Kuraki from her fifth Fuse of Love (2005). The song was written by Kuraki and Hitoshi Okamoto, and produced by Kuraki herself and Kannonji. The song served as the seasonal theme song to Mezamashi Saturday. The single was released on 1 June 2005 through Giza Studio as the third single from Fuse of Love. 

"P.S My Sunshine" is a J-pop track with a teen pop element, arranged by its composer, Hitoshi Okamoto. The single peaked at number eight in Japan and became Kuraki's twenty-first consecutive number ten single.

Track listing

Charts

Daily charts

Weekly charts

Monthly charts

Certification and sales

|-
! scope="row"| Japan (RIAJ)
| None
| 41,936 
|-
|}

References

External links
Mai Kuraki Official Website

Mai Kuraki songs
2005 singles
Songs written by Mai Kuraki
2005 songs
Giza Studio singles
Song recordings produced by Daiko Nagato